Kaj Matti Juhani Eskelinen (born 21 February 1969) is a Swedish former footballer who played as a midfielder and forward. He was the Allsvenskan top scorer when his IFK Göteborg was crowned Swedish Champions in 1990.

Playing career
Eskelinen played for Västra Frölunda IF, IFK Göteborg, SK Brann, Djurgårdens IF, Hammarby IF, and FC Café Opera during a career that spanned between 1987 and 2002. He was the Allsvenskan top scorer in 1990. He represented the Sweden U17, U19, and U21 teams a combined total of 27 times, scoring 11 goals.

Personal life
He is of Finnish descent. His son William is also a footballer.

Honours 
IFK Göteborg

 Swedish Champion: 1990, 1991
 Svenska Cupen: 1991

Individual

 Allsvenskan top scorer: 1990

References

1969 births
Living people
Swedish footballers
Sweden under-21 international footballers
Swedish expatriate footballers
Allsvenskan players
Eliteserien players
Västra Frölunda IF players
IFK Göteborg players
SK Brann players
Djurgårdens IF Fotboll players
Hammarby Fotboll players
AFC Eskilstuna players
Expatriate footballers in Norway
Swedish people of Finnish descent
Association football forwards